Liverpool Packet was a privateer schooner from Liverpool, Nova Scotia, that captured 50 American vessels in the War of 1812. American privateers captured Liverpool Packet in 1813, but she failed to take any prizes during the four months before she was recaptured. She was repurchased by her original Nova Scotia owners and returned to raiding American commerce. Liverpool Packet was the most successful privateer vessel ever to sail out of a Canadian port.

Canadian privateer
Liverpool Packet was originally the American slave ship Severn, built at Baltimore and rigged as a Baltimore Clipper style schooner.  captured the schooner in August 1811. The Halifax Vice Admiralty Court, under Chief Justice Alexander Croke, condemned Severn as an illegal slave ship as both Britain and the United States had recently outlawed the Transatlantic Slave Trade. The court then ordered her sold at auction and Enos Collins and other investors purchased her in October 1811. They renamed her Liverpool Packet, although she sometimes bore the nickname The Black Joke, a name of several infamous slave ships. At first her owners used the small and fast schooner as a packet ship carrying mail and passengers between Halifax and Liverpool, Nova Scotia.

War of 1812 
Upon the outbreak of the War of 1812, the owners of Liverpool Packet quickly converted her to a privateer. Under the command of Joseph Barss Jnr, she captured at least 33 American vessels during the first year of the war. His strategy was to lie in wait off Cape Cod, snapping up American ships headed to Boston or New York.

Captive 
She was a menace to New England shipping until the Americans captured her in 1813. On 10 June the privateer schooner Thomas of Portsmouth, New Hampshire, Captain Shaw, master, mounting twelve guns and manned with a crew of one hundred men, encountered Packet. Thomas chased her for about five hours but light winds prevented Liverpool Packet from escaping.

Liverpool Packet struck her colours but then as the Americans came alongside the two vessels ran into each other. As the British ran up to push the vessels apart, the Americans, fearing they were going to be boarded, boarded Liverpool Packet. Firing broke out that killed three Americans. American anger over their earlier losses to the Packet resulted in poor treatment of Barss, who languished in jail for months on a diet of bread and water until he was exchanged for American prisoners held in Halifax.

In American hands she was briefly renamed Young Teaser's Ghost, after the recently destroyed American privateer Young Teazer. Failing to take any British prizes, she was renamed again as Portsmouth Packet. Under this name and under the command of Captain John Perkins, she had a short, unsuccessful career failing to capture a single prize for the Americans.

Recaptured 
On 5 October 1813,  and  recaptured Liverpool Packet, then sailing under the name Portsmouth Packet, off Mount Desert Island, Maine, after a chase of thirteen hours. At the time, the privateer schooner was armed with five guns, carried a crew of 45, and had sailed from Portsmouth the previous day.

The recaptured schooner was brought into Halifax where her original owners repurchased her and restored the name of Liverpool Packet. She was registered there in 1813.

Under a new captain named Caleb Seeley, she captured fourteen prizes before the year ended. In 1814, she captured additional prizes in May and June. Then in August, she took two prizes while acting in concert with  while they were sailing off of Bridgeport and New York. Liverpool Packet continued to work often with British naval vessels right to the war's end.

Fate
Her owners registered Liverpool Packet at Nova Scotia on 6 January 1816. At some point thereafter, her owners sold her in Kingston, Jamaica; her subsequent fate is not known. 

A Liverpool Packet, Steven Singleton, master, is mentioned carrying emigrants to the United States from England in 1817 in the Memorials of the Clarke Family. However, as the privateer schooner Liverpool Packet was too small for emigrant trade, this reference is likely one of several packet ships operating out of Liverpool, England which also bore the name Liverpool Packet. 41 members of the vegetarian Bible Christian Church led by Reverent William Metcalfe, immigrated to the United States in 1817 on a Liverpool Packet operating out of England seeking religious freedom, eventually forming the first national vegetarian organization and the American vegetarian movement.

The War of 1812 was the last time the British allowed privateering. The practice was coming to be seen as politically inexpedient and of diminishing value in maintaining Britain's naval supremacy. The Treaty of Paris in 1856 banned privateering. However, the United States did not sign the treaty because the Americans saw their large merchant marine as a potential source of privateers in case of war.

Post script
In all, Liverpool Packet had taken 50 prizes in her brief but successful career. Her captures helped launch the great fortune of Enos Collins. Two steamships from her old homeport of Liverpool, Nova Scotia, were named in her honour in the 20th century.

Notes

Citations

References
Conlin, Dan (1999) "A Slave Ship Made Captive: The Schooner Severn", Journal of the Royal Nova Scotia Historical Society, Vol. 2, pp. 203–212.
Kert, Faye. Prize and Prejudice.
Leefe, John. (1978) The Atlantic Privateers: their story – 1749-1815. (Petheric Press; Nimbus Publishing).
Snider, C.F.J. (1928) Under the Red Jack:Privateers of the Maritime Provinces of Canada in the War of 1812. (London: Martin Hopkinson & Co.)
Stewart, James (1814) Reports of Cases Argued and Determined in the Court of Vice-Admiralty at Halifax, in Nova Scotia: From the Commencement of the War in 1803 to the End of the Year 1813, in the Time of Alexander Croke, Judge of that Court. (J. Butterworth).

External links
Dan Conlin Profile of the privateer schooner Liverpool Packet
Article about Caleb Seeley

Packet (sea transport)
Ships built in Baltimore
War of 1812 ships of Canada
Tall ships of Canada
Individual sailing vessels
Schooners
Privateer ships
Conflicts in Nova Scotia
Military history of Nova Scotia
Baltimore Clipper
Slave ships